Archie W. Dunham (born 1938) is the former chairman emeritus and former independent non-executive chairman of Chesapeake Energy in Oklahoma City.  He served as president and chief executive officer of Conoco Inc. from January 1996 to August 2002, then as chairman of ConocoPhillips, following the merger of Conoco Inc. and Phillips Petroleum Company, until his retirement on September 30, 2004.

Early life and education
Dunham grew up in Oklahoma. After earning a bachelor's degree in geological engineering from the University of Oklahoma in 1960, he was commissioned as a second lieutenant in the United States Marine Corps. Dunham served four years in the Marines, then returned to the University of Oklahoma to complete an MBA in 1966.

Career
Dunham joined Conoco Inc. in 1966 and subsequently held a number of commercial and managerial positions within Conoco and E. I. du Pont de Nemours and Company ("DuPont"). Dunham served as senior vice president of polymers and executive vice president of E.I. du Pont de Nemours and Company, Conoco's former parent, from 1995 to October 1998. Dunham served as executive vice president of exploration production and executive vice president of refining, marketing, supply and transportation for Conoco. He served as chairman, president, and CEO of Conoco Inc. (integrated energy company) from August 1999 to August 2002 and also served as chairman of ConocoPhillips (integrated energy company) from August 2002, following the merger of Conoco Inc. and Phillips Petroleum Company, until his retirement on September 30, 2004.

Dunham was previously a board director of DuPont, Phelps Dodge, Pride International, Union Pacific and Louisiana-Pacific.

He was past Chairman of the United States Energy Association, the National Petroleum Council and the National Association of Manufacturers. Dunham is also a member of the board of visitors at the University of Oklahoma. He was a director of the American Petroleum Institute, the U.S.–Russia Business Council and the Greater Houston Partnership. He served on the board of the Memorial Hermann Healthcare System in Houston, the board of visitors of M.D. Anderson Cancer Center, the board of trustees of the Houston Symphony, the George Bush Presidential Library, and the Smithsonian Institution. He served as a trustee of Houston Grand Opera and was a member of The Business Council and The Business Roundtable. He was also a former member of the Deutsche Bank advisory board of directors.

In 2012, Dunham was appointed Independent Non-executive chairman of Chesapeake Energy as part of changes to the board of directors following concerns about loans and other corporate governance issues made under the watch of former CEO and chairman Aubrey McClendon. On 10/12/15, current Chesapeake Energy director and former Saks Inc. Chief Executive Brad Martin was named Non-executive chairman of its board, succeeding Dunham, who became Chairman Emeritus. Dunham retired from the Chesapeake Energy board on May 17, 2019.

Marriage and children
Archie and Linda Dunham married in 1960. The couple have three children: Steven, Laura, and Cary.

Awards

1996: Inducted into the University of Oklahoma College of Engineering's Distinguished Graduates Society
1998 Community Partners Houston Father of the Year.
1998: Inducted into Oklahoma Hall of Fame.
1999: Honorary Doctorate in humane letters from the University of Oklahoma.
2000: New York Mercantile Exchange award for CEO of the Year for Global Vision in Energy.
2000: International Achievement Award by B'nai B'rith.
2001: Horatio Alger Association of Distinguished Americans
2001: Ellis Island Medal of Honor.
2004: Greater Houston Partnership International Executive of the Year.
2005: John Rogers Award
2006: Inducted into Offshore Energy Center Hall of Fame.
2011: Houston Baptist University Spirit of Excellence Award.

References

1938 births
Living people
American chief executives of energy companies
ConocoPhillips people
United States Marine Corps officers
University of Oklahoma alumni